The 1943–44 Challenge Cup was the 43rd staging of rugby league's oldest knockout competition, the Challenge Cup.

The final was contested by Bradford Northern and Wigan, and was played over two legs. The final was won by Bradford Northern 8–3 on aggregate.

First round

Second round

Semifinals

Final

First leg

Second leg

Bradford Northern win 8–3 on aggregate.

References

External links
Challenge Cup official website 
Challenge Cup 1943/44 results at Rugby League Project

Challenge Cup
Challenge Cup